Norman Mason ( Norman Kellogg Mason; 25 November 1895 Nassau, Bahamas – 6 July 1971 St. Louis) was an American jazz clarinetist, multi-instrumentalist, and bandleader.

Career 
Mason was born in Nassau, Bahamas, to Ellis Hartman Mason ( Ellis Henry Mason; 1872–1937) and Alice Leanora Bartlett (died 1942). He immigrated to the United States in 1913 and, initially, lived in Miami.  He began playing trumpet at age eight, – as did his brother, Henry Mason ( Henry Morris Mason; born 1906). He toured with revues such as the Rabbit Foot Minstrel Show while still in his teens, and soon after became active on the New Orleans jazz scene. Soon after he played in bands in Chicago and St. Louis.

At the end of the 1910s Mason played with Fate Marable, where he began playing alto saxophone. Toward the beginning of the next decade, Mason was a member of Ed Allen's Whispering Gold Band, and soon after led his own ensemble, the Carolina Melodists (though they had no actual connection to North or South Carolina). For one year, he and the Melodists played on radio stations WIL and KMOX in St. Louis. From 1927 to 1933 Mason returned to duty under Marable, and after leaving his employ Mason began playing clarinet in Chicago and St. Louis bands.

In the mid-1950s, Mason headed the Dixie Stompers band in St. Louis. The group's April 6, 1957, performance at Westminster College's annual jazz concert was recorded by Blue Note Records and released as Jazz st Westminster College on a 12-inch LP by Delmar Records (catalog no. DL-201; matrix runout nos.:  & ). Bob Koester, founder of Delmar, wrote the liner notes.

Mason was a clarinetist with Singleton Palmer's Dixieland Six, which, after two years as the regular band at the Opera House in Gaslight Square, recorded a live session there in 1961. It was released as Dixie by Gaslight on an LP by Norman Records, a St. Louis-based jazz label founded a year earlier by Norman Wienstroer ( Norman Henry Wienstroer; 1916–1999). The album was Palmer's first recording as a leader.

Mason lived in St. Louis for the next several decades, playing often with Singleton Palmer, but his career ended in 1969 after a stroke.

Family 
One of Mason's sisters, May Ingraham ( Mary Naomi Mason; 1901–1982), married to Rufus Harcourt Ingraham, Sr. (1900–1967), was founder and president of the Bahamian Women's Suffrage Movement established in 1950 that led to changing Bahamian law in 1961 to allow women the vote, beginning 1962. In 2012, on the 50th Anniversary of the Granting of Universal Suffrage to Women in the Bahamas – the Bahamas Post Office issued commemorative panes of six postage stamps, each bearing a portrait of an influential woman exponent of female suffrage. Ingraham is one of the six.

Bibliography

Annotations

General references 

<li> [ Norman Mason] at Allmusic

Notes

Inline references 

 . . .
 . . .
 

 

  (e-book). .
<li> Vol. 1: Early Jazz Trumpet Legends
<li> Vol. 2: Modern Jazz Trumpet Legends
<li> Vol. 3: Current Jazz Trumpet Legends
 (a 1919 photo on p. 76 shows Mason with the Marable band aboard the S.S. Capitol). . .

 
 
 (Abstract: This chapter examines Armstrong's development as a musician during his time with Marable and his orchestra on the Streckfus riverboats. Joe Howard (trumpet), Norman Mason, and Davy Jones, all good readers and veterans of the minstrel shows, helped Armstrong with his studies. This chapter explores the changing dance tempos as jazz and the foxtrot replaced ragtime and the one-step). .  (chapter).  (chapter).  (e-book).

1895 births
1971 deaths
American jazz trumpeters
American male trumpeters
American jazz saxophonists
American male saxophonists
American jazz clarinetists
American jazz bandleaders
American male jazz musicians
20th-century American male musicians
20th-century American saxophonists
Bahamian emigrants to the United States